Hoch Eissa is a city in Beheira Governorate, Egypt.

The 1885 Census of Egypt recorded Hoch Eissa as a nahiyah in the district of Abu Hummus in Beheira Governorate; at that time, the population of the town was 1,480 (745 men and 735 women).

See also

 List of cities and towns in Egypt

References

Populated places in Beheira Governorate